The Bad Lands is a 1925 American silent Western film directed by Dell Henderson and featuring Harry Carey.

Plot
As described in a film magazine reviews, Patrick Angus O’Toole reaches the fort where he has been assigned to clear up a lot of smuggling. Mary, the daughter of Colonel Owen, is wooed by Captain Blake, although she admires O’Toole. Her younger brother, Hal Owen, becomes indebted by gambling to Blake. Blake is jealous of O’Toole and therefore takes revenge on Hal by demanding payment of the debts within 24 hours. Hal attempts a stage coach robbery to get the money. O’Toole arrives in time to see the stage driver shot by a stray bullet. The money bags are later found in O’Toole’s room and he is put in prison. In an Indian attack, Hal is shot and, on his death bed, confesses to the robbery. O’Toole is cleared of the criminal charges and openly courts the young woman. Mary reciprocates his love.

Cast

References

External links

 
 
 
 

1925 films
1925 Western (genre) films
American black-and-white films
Producers Distributing Corporation films
Silent American Western (genre) films
Films directed by Dell Henderson
1920s American films